USS Tillamook has been the name of more than one United States Navy ship, and may refer to:

 , previously Tug No. 16, later YT-122, later YTM-122, a tug in commission from 1914 to 1947
 , later USS SP-269, a patrol vessel in commission from 1917 to 1919
 , originally USS ATA-192, a tug in commission from 1945 to 1971

United States Navy ship names